Captain Video is an album by pianist Andy LaVerne recorded in 1981 and released on the Japanese Atlas label.

Reception 

Ken Dryden of AllMusic stated: "This recommended, but unfortunately out of print LP, will be challenging to locate".

Track listing 
 "Speak Low" (Kurt Weill, Ogden Nash) – 5:33
 "Con Alma" (Dizzy Gillespie) – 5:03
 "Duke Ellington's Sound of Love" (Charles Mingus) – 4:13
 "There's a Boat Dat's Leavin Soon for New York" (George Gershwin, Ira Gershwin) – 6:36
 "Captain Video" (Andy LaVerne) – 4:47
 "Spring Is Here" (Richard Rodgers, Lorenz Hart) – 5:34
 "How About You?" (Burton Lane, Ralph Freed) – 3:47
 "You Go To My Head" (J. Fred Coots, Haven Gillespie) – 7:22

Source:

Personnel 
Andy LaVerne – piano
Bob Magnusson – bass
Shelly Manne – drums

Source:

References 

 

Andy LaVerne albums
1981 albums
Atlas Records albums